Lawrence Central High School (LCHS) is a public high school with more than 2,300 students, in northeast Marion County, Indiana.

Overview

It was established in 1940 and is one of two high schools in the Metropolitan School District of Lawrence Township.

Athletics
LC athletic teams have enjoyed success, including recent state titles in baseball and both men's and Women's Track and Field. Past success in Conference Indiana has been enjoyed by the football team, with several championships in the early 2000s as well as a 5A State Runner-up finish in 2010. LC's football team went on to become the 2012 5A state champions.  The Men's Track and Field team won state championships in 1998 and 2005. The Baseball team won a state championship in 2004. The LC gymnastics team won its first team state title in 2007. LC has also enjoyed titles of sectional, regional and state level in individual wrestling, women's cross country, and men's and women's track champions.

As of 2013, Lawrence Central High School left Conference Indiana and joined the Metropolitan Interscholastic Conference.

Performing arts
The Lawrence Central Marching Band (the "Spirit of Central Marching Band & Guard") is a two-time Bands of America Grand National Champion, receiving the award in 2001 and 2004. The marching band is also the 2002 BOA Grand National Runner-Up and 2008 Grand National Second Runner-Up. At BOA Grand National Finals, the marching band has won the Outstanding Visual caption award in 2002, 2004, 2006, and 2008 (tie-Avon High School). The marching band has been a consistent BOA Grand National Finalist since 1996. The marching band has also won the ISSMA State Marching Band Championship in 1997, 1998, 2000, and 2008. The marching band has also performed in multiple parades, including the Philadelphia Thanksgiving Day parade in 1996 and 2002, the Hollywood Christmas Parade in 1999, the Tournament of Roses Parade in 2005, the 2006 Macy's Thanksgiving Day Parade, and the 2008 Fiesta Bowl Parade. At the 2008 Fiesta Bowl National Band Championship, the band won first place and the Grand Master Trophy. They are also the first band to win in the new Lucas Oil Stadium(Four Times) and the first to achieve a perfect score in the percussion sub-caption in 2008. All three bands have not won a silver or lower since 1984 in the ISSMA competitions.The Wind Ensemble and Symphony Orchestra at Lawrence Central also both won their respective titles as ISSMA State Champions in 2005, as they have on a few occasions in the past, including a recent 2008 win. Lawrence Central is also home to two award-winning show choirs. "Central Sound" and "Sweet Sensation", who both compete in the ISSMA State Show choir competition along with other invitationals throughout the year. For the last three years "Sweet Sensation" has placed a respectable third place at the State Competition and placed first at Center Grove in 2008 and also at Anderson HS in 2007. The Central Sound was undefeated at all of the regional competitions they attended in 2009. Central Sound placed 3rd in the Nation at the Showstoppers Invitational in Orlando, Fl in 2009. Other performing arts programs include Thespian Society, Winter Guard, and Jazz Ensemble, as well as an award-winning speech team.

The Lawrence Central Performing Arts Association is the "umbrella" parent-teacher organization which engages families in activities involving each or all of the performing arts programs. It provides a novel approach through collaborative support, uniting all members in activities, regardless of which group their child is in, to benefit the program as a whole. Activities include fund-raising, volunteerism, and public relations. The website in the above link is updated weekly to keep families informed.

Extracurricular activities

Lawrence Central has many extracurricular clubs and activities. Currently these extracurricular activities are available:
Anime Club, Bowling Club, Best Buddies, Cub Reporter, Color Guard, Chess Club, Choir, Classic Gaming Club, Cross Country, Dance, Drama (Musicals and Plays), Euchre Club, International Thespian Society, Jazz Band, Key Club, LC Latinos, LC Players, National Honor Society, PEERS, Pep Band, Rock Climbing, Science Club, Show Choir, Skiing, Spanish Club, Speech Team, Swimming and Diving, Bears' Den Yearbook, Winter Guard, Marching Band, Marching Orchestra, German Club, Tribal Regime, Corpse Corps, Parcheesi Club, LaRue Carter Club, Epic Spore Club.

Notable alumni
Frank Levinson, co-founder of Finisar Corporation
Jeremy Hollowell, professional basketball player
Joshua Sales, drummer for Sam Hunt
Kyle Guy, NBA basketball player and 2019 NCAA final four Most Outstanding Player
Derrick Harris, former Running Back in the NFL
Kind Butler III, US track and field athlete
Gerrid Doaks, NFL Running Back for the Houston Texans
Jake LaRavia, NBA Player for the Memphis Grizzlies
Derrick Ransom, former Defensive Tackle in the NFL
Norm Sloan, Former college basketball coach
Sarah Jo Pender, convicted killer
Cameron McGrone, NFL Linebacker for the Indianapolis Colts
Tre Roberson, CFL Cornerback for the Calgary Stampeders
J.J. Montgomery, MLB pitcher for the Baltimore Orioles
Christian Montgomery, former MLB pitcher for the New York Mets

See also
 List of high schools in Indiana

References

External links
 Lawrence Central High School
 Lawrence Central Performing Arts Assoc.

Schools in Marion County, Indiana
Education in Indianapolis
Educational institutions established in 1941
Public high schools in Indiana
International Baccalaureate schools in Indiana
1941 establishments in Indiana